Raja Chinna Roja is a 1989 Indian Tamil-language children's film, directed by S. P. Muthuraman, and produced by AVM Productions. The plot revolves around Raja (Rajinikanth), who arrives in the city to become an actor. In the process he meets his childhood friend (Raghuvaran) and is forced to take care of his nieces and nephews.

Raja Chinna Roja was the first Indian film to feature live action with animation. The cinematography was handled by T. S. Vinayagam, while the editing was done by the duo R. Vittal and Lancy respectively. The soundtrack was composed by Chandrabose, with the song "Superstar Yaarunu" attaining popularity.

Raja Chinna Roja was released on 20 July 1989. The film was commercially successful and had a 175-day theatrical run, with the animated sequence particularly being well received.

Plot 

An aspiring actor Raja from a village get into a fast city which is full of crooks and drug dealers. As he searching for a place in the dream factory, he falls for Usha, the daughter of the house owner. Charmed by his looks and character, Usha also falls for him. One day he accidentally meets his childhood friend Bhaskar, who is a spoiled rich guy. He offers Raja an acting job, then takes him to his uncle's house. Raja is to be in charge of the administration of the household and take care of five children (Bhaskar's nieces and nephews), each of whom have issues (such as being lazy, not studying etc.).

Raja finds out that Bhaskar is cheating his uncle out of funds and using him to do the same. Bhaskar is involved in drug business along with his associates. Ravichandran who gets temporary blindness, recovers from the problem and pretends to be blind in order to find out the truth of Bhaskar. After finding out the truth, Ravichandran throws Bhaskaran out of the home. In retaliation, Bhaskar takes away his uncle's car resulting in Ravichandran getting arrested for drugs. Raja, along with the children goes to Bhaskar's den and catches him red-handed. Raja finally achieves his ambition to become an actor, with Rajaram directing the film.

Cast 
 Rajinikanth as Raja
 Raghuvaran as Bhaskar
 Gautami as Sumathi
 Ravichandran as Rajaram
 S. S. Chandran as a butler
 Kovai Sarala as a maid
 Baby Shalini as Chithra
 Kitty as Bhaskar's associate
 Chinni Jayanth as Raja's friend
 Azhagu as Bhaskar's associate
 Kumari Raghavi as Rajaram's daughter
 V. K. Ramasamy as Rajaram's uncle
 LIC Narasimhan as Police inspector
 Rupini as herself (cameo)

Production

Development 
After the success of Manithan (1987), M. Saravanan of AVM Productions decided to produce another film with the same cast and crew: director S. P. Muthuraman, hero Rajinikanth and composer Chandrabose. Saravanan wanted to make a film "targeted at kids" due to Rajinikanth's popularity among children. The crew initially wanted to adapt Babu (1971); however, Rajinikanth "felt that the script seemed more like an art film, on the lines of Aarilirunthu Arubathu Varai and Engeyo Ketta Kural" and it would not suit his image. Screenwriter Panchu Arunachalam reused the script of his own film Unnaithan Thambi (1974) and "decided to have a story that involved a bunch of kids and decided to follow the successful formula that was laid out by films like The Sound Of Music and Mary Poppins".

Casting and filming 
The makers decided to revolve the story around Shalini, who was cast among the child artists, due to her popularity. Raghuvaran was chosen to portray a negative role after the makers were impressed with his performance in the television series Oru Manithanin Kathai. Raja Chinna Roja was the first Indian film to feature live action with animation. It was Saravanan's wish to do this, without any budgetary constraints. He also wanted AVM to become the first Indian studio to do this. The idea of blending live action with animation was inspired by Who Framed Roger Rabbit (1988). The animated song was shot at a forest set built by art director Chalam at AVM Studios with all the artists involved. Puliyur Saroja, choreographer of the song along with her assistants enact like animals to "evoke the appropriate reaction from the artistes". The animation was done by Ram Mohan, who "ended up drawing 84,000 sketches for this song as every frame had to be drawn individually".

Soundtrack 
The soundtrack was composed by Chandrabose and the lyrics were written by Vairamuthu. The song "Superstar Yaarunu Ketta" was well-received and was remixed by Chandrabose's son Santhosh Bose for the film Kalayatha Ninaivugal (2005).

Release 
Raja Chinna Roja was released on 20 July 1989 and became a commercial success, with a 175-day theatrical run. The animated sequence was well received, and brought repeat audiences to theatres.

References

Bibliography

External links 

1980s children's films
1980s Tamil-language films
1989 films
AVM Productions films
Films directed by S. P. Muthuraman
Films scored by Chandrabose (composer)
Films shot in Ooty
Films with screenplays by Panchu Arunachalam
Indian children's films
Indian films with live action and animation